Kenan Karaman (born 5 March 1994) is a Turkish professional footballer who plays as a striker for Bundesliga club Schalke 04 and the Turkey national team.

Club career
On 29 April 2014, Karaman signed a pre-contract agreement with Hannover 96 effective 1 July 2014. Since his contract at Hoffenheim had expired, he was able to join Hannover on a free transfer and signed for three years until 2017.

On 18 May 2018, Karaman joined newly promoted Fortuna Düsseldorf from 2.Bundesliga on a free transfer for a three-year deal. He was given the number 11 shirt. He left Fortuna upon the expiration of his contract on 24 May 2021.

On 1 September 2022, Karaman signed a three-year contract with Bundesliga side Schalke 04.

International career
Karaman made his senior debut for the senior Turkey national football team in a friendly 2–0 loss to Romania on 9 November 2017.

Career statistics

Club

International

Scores and results list Turkey's goal tally first.

Honours
Beşiktaş
Süper Kupa: 2021

References

External links

 Profile at the FC Schalke 04 website
 Profile at kicker.de
 
 

1994 births
Living people
Footballers from Stuttgart
Association football forwards
Citizens of Turkey through descent
Turkish footballers
Turkey international footballers
Turkey under-21 international footballers
Turkey youth international footballers
German footballers
German people of Turkish descent
TSG 1899 Hoffenheim players
TSG 1899 Hoffenheim II players
Hannover 96 players
Hannover 96 II players
Fortuna Düsseldorf players
Beşiktaş J.K. footballers
FC Schalke 04 players
Bundesliga players
2. Bundesliga players
Süper Lig players
UEFA Euro 2020 players